The Chinese multiplication table is the first requisite for using the Rod calculus for carrying out multiplication, division, the extraction of square roots, and the solving of equations based on place value decimal notation. It was known in China as early as the Spring and Autumn period, and survived through the age of the abacus; pupils in elementary school today still must memorise it. 

The Chinese multiplication table consists of eighty-one terms. It was often called the nine-nine table, or simply nine-nine, because in ancient times, the nine nine table started with  9×9:   nine nines beget eighty-one, eight nines beget seventy-two ... seven nines beget sixty three, etc.  two ones beget one. In the opinion of Wang Guowei, a noted scholar, the nine-nine table probably started with nine because of the "worship of nine" in ancient China; the emperor was considered the "nine five supremacy" in the Book of Change. See also Numbers in Chinese culture#Nine.

It is also known as nine-nine song (or poem), as the table consists of eighty-one lines with four or five Chinese characters per lines; this thus created a constant metre and render the multiplication table as a poem. For example, 9x9=81 would be rendered as "九九八十一", or "nine nine eighty one", with the world for "begets" "得" implied. This makes it easy to learn by heart. A shorter version of the table consists of only forty-five sentences, as terms such as "nine eights beget seventy-two" are identical to "eight nines beget seventy-two" so there is no need to learn them twice. When the abacus replaced the counting rods in the Ming dynasty, many authors on the abacus advocated the use of the full table instead of the shorter one. They claimed that memorising it without needing a moment of thinking makes abacus calculation much faster.

The existence of the Chinese multiplication table is evidence of an early positional decimal system: otherwise a much larger multiplication table would be needed with terms beyond 9×9.

The Nine-nine song text in Chinese
It can be read in either row-major or column-major order.

The Nine-nine table in Chinese literature

Many Chinese classics make reference to the nine-nine table:
 Zhoubi Suanjing: "nine nine eighty one"
 Guan Zi has sentences of the form "three eights beget twenty four, three sevens beget twenty-one"
 The Nine Chapters on the Mathematical Art: "Fu Xi invented the art of nine-nine".
 In Huainanzi, there were eight sentences: "nine nines beget eighty one", "eight nines beget seventy two", all the way to "two nines beget eighteen".
 A nine-nine table manuscript was discovered in Dun Huang.
 Xia Houyang's Computational Canons: "To learn the art of multiplication and division,one must understand nine-nine".
 The Song dynasty author Hong Zhai's Notebooks said: "three threes as nine, three fours as twelve, two eights as sixteen, four fours as sixteen, three nines as twenty seven, four nines as thirty six, six sixes as thirty six, five eights as forty, five nines as forty five, seven nines as sixty three, eight nines as seventy two, nine nines as eighty one". This suggests that the table has begun with the smallest term since the Song dynasty.
 Song dynasty mathematician Yang Hui's mathematics text book: Suan fa tong bian ben mo, meaning "You must learn nine nine song from one one equals one to nine nine eighty one, in small to large order"
 Yuan dynasty mathematician Zhu Shijie's Suanxue  qimeng (Elementary mathematics): "one one equals one, two by two equals four, one by three equals three, two by three equals six,  three by three equals nine, one by four equals four... nine by nine equals eight one"

Archeological artifacts

 At the end of the 19th century, archeologists unearthed pieces of written bamboo script from the Han dynasty in Xin Jiang. One such Han dynasty bamboo script, from Liusha, is a remnant of the nine-nine table. It starts with nine: nine nine eighty one, eight nine seventy two, seven nine sixty three, eight eight sixty four, seven eight fifty six, six eight forty eight, ... two two gets four, altogether 1100 Chinese words.
In 2002, Chinese archeologists unearthed a written wood script from a two-thousand-year-old site from the Warring States, on which was written: "four eight thirty two, five eight forty, six eight forty eight." This is the earliest artifact of the nine-nine table that has been unearthed, indicating that the nine-nine table, as well as a positional decimal system, had appeared by the Warring States period. 
 The nine-nine table was transmitted to Japan, and appeared in a Japanese primary mathematics book in the 10th century, beginning with 9×9.

References

Chinese mathematics